Dhamali is a village in Achham District in the Seti Zone of western Nepal. At the time of the 1991 Nepal census, the village had a population of 3212 living in 638 houses. At the time of the 2001 Nepal census, the population was 4111, of which 25% was literate.

References

Populated places in Achham District
Village development committees in Achham District